Kasumi may refer to:

Places
 Kasumi, Hyōgo (香住), a former town in Hyōgo Prefecture, Japan
 Kasumigaseki (霞が関 "Gate of Mist"), a district in downtown Tokyo
 Kasumi, Jajce, a village in Bosnia and Herzegovina

Other uses
 Kasumi (given name), a feminine Japanese given name
 Japanese destroyer Kasumi (霞 "Mist"), two Imperial Japanese destroyers
 KASUMI (block cipher), a cipher used in the 3GPP mobile communications network
 "Kasumi", a single in the Dir En Grey discography
 Kasumi (comics), a shoujo/shojo manga series by Surt Lim and Hirofumi Sugimoto
 Kasumi (Danzan-ryu technique), technique of Kodokan judo

See also
 Kasumi Ninja, a video game